Jennifer Whitmore (born July 1974) is an Irish Social Democrats politician who has been a Teachta Dála (TD) for the Wicklow constituency since the 2020 general election.

Early life and education
Whitmore is from Wexford. She gained two diplomas at the Galway-Mayo Institute of Technology and later graduated with a Bachelor of Science in Biological Science and Ecology from the University of Ulster. During the ten years she resided in Australia, she studied Environmental Law at the University of Sydney.

Career
Whitmore has worked in both local and international ecology and environmentalism as well as with the Government of New South Wales, Australia. In 2015, she founded the East Wicklow Rivers Trust.

She was elected to represent the Greystones local electoral area on the Wicklow County Council, following the 2014 local elections. In July 2015, she helped co-found the Social Democrats as a party and became the party's Spokesperson for Children.

Whitmore was elected as a Social Democrat TD for the Wicklow constituency following the 2020 general election. In the election, she came ahead of former Social Democrats TD and leader Stephen Donnelly who left the party after just one year, citing difficulties in cooperating with the other leaders. 

In September 2021, Whitmore tabled a Just Transition Bill in the Dáil; the Bill was deliberately almost identical to one the Green Party had tabled in 2017 while in opposition but had been voted down. At the time, Green leader Eamon Ryan called their proposed bill a "critical piece of the architecture" of any policy on climate action. One amendment Whitmore did make however was to define the term "Just Transition", as the previous version of the bill did not. Whitmore said the bill would define "just transition" as a green transition that ensures the economic and social consequences of the climate emergency are managed to maximise "opportunities of decent work for all, reduce inequalities, promote social justice, and support industries, workers and communities negatively affected".

Personal life
Whitmore lives in Delgany, County Wicklow, with her husband Tony and their four children.

References

External links
Social Democrats profile

1974 births
Living people
Alumni of Galway-Mayo Institute of Technology
Alumni of Ulster University
Irish women environmentalists
Irish women scientists
Local councillors in County Wicklow
Members of the 33rd Dáil
21st-century women Teachtaí Dála
Social Democrats (Ireland) TDs
University of Sydney alumni
Irish emigrants to Australia